El Toro is a corregimiento in Las Minas District, Herrera Province, Panama with a population of 931 as of 2010. Its population as of 1990 was 1,073; its population as of 2000 was 797.

References

Corregimientos of Herrera Province